Fallceon is a genus of blue-winged olives in the family of mayflies called Baetidae. There are about 19 described species in Fallceon.

Species
These 19 species belong to the genus Fallceon:

 Fallceon alcarrazae (Kluge, 1992) c g
 Fallceon ater Hofmann & Thomas, 1999 c g
 Fallceon eatoni (Kimmins, 1934) i c g
 Fallceon fortipalpus Lugo-Ortiz and McCafferty, 1994 i c g
 Fallceon garcianus (Traver, 1938) c g
 Fallceon grandis González-Lazo and Salles, 2007 i c g
 Fallceon inops (Navás, 1912) c g
 Fallceon longifolius (Kluge, 1992) i c g
 Fallceon murphyae (Hubbard, 1976) c g
 Fallceon nikitai McCafferty & Lugo-Ortiz, 1994 c g
 Fallceon planifrons (Kluge, 1992) i c g
 Fallceon poeyi (Eaton, 1885) c g
 Fallceon quilleri (Dodds, 1923) i c g b
 Fallceon sageae McCafferty, 2008 i c g
 Fallceon sextus (Kluge, 1992) c g
 Fallceon sonora (Allen and Murvosh, 1987) i g
 Fallceon testudineus (Kluge, 1992) c g
 Fallceon thermophilos (McDunnough, 1926) i c g
 Fallceon yaro (Traver, 1971) c g

Data sources: i = ITIS, c = Catalogue of Life, g = GBIF, b = Bugguide.net

References

Further reading

 
 
 
 
 
 

Mayflies
Mayfly genera